Neopoeciloderma lepturoides is a species of beetle in the family Cerambycidae, the only species in the genus Neopoeciloderma.

References

Heteropsini